Marichjhanpi is an island set in the mangrove forests of the Sundarbans in West Bengal, India. It is mostly remembered today for the incident in 1979 when the newly elected Communist Party of India (Marxist) government of West Bengal evicted several Bengali Dalit refugees who had saving their life in the reserved forest . The clash between armed miscreants and the police resulted in about 10000(mentioned in blood island book)deaths; although the exact number is unknown, researchers believe that several collateral deaths took place from violent clashes, alleged police brutality, and disease.

Geography

Background
The Partition of India in 1947 split the large eastern province of Bengal into two halves, along religious lines. One half became West Bengal, a Hindu-majority province in the new independent state of India. The other half became East Pakistan, the Muslim-majority eastern half of Pakistan, and later the independent country of Bangladesh.

Refugee
Partition was accompanied by much bloodshed and suffering, and the mass migration of millions of people - Hindus from their ancestral lands in East Pakistan across to India, Muslims from India trekking in the opposite direction. This cross-transfer of peoples continued through the decades after Partition, although at a much slower rate. While the educated upper classes were able to settle themselves in the urban environs of Calcutta, the poor  Hindus were moved to areas outside West Bengal, in inhospitable terrain in Orissa and Chhattisgarh. Dry forest regions usually inhibited by the adivasis, a region broadly called Dandakaranya. There they lived in concentration camp like conditions. Similar looking huts or tarpaulin tents were put up to be crammed with refugees. The boundaries were surrounded by barbed wires and guarded. The places were named Permanent Liability Camps.

Invitation to Bengal
The main party of opposition in Bengal the CPI(M) continually provided voice to these refugees from Bangladesh from the outset. They argued that rehabilitation of all Bengali speaking refugees was possible within West Bengal and called upon all refugees to go there. They even assured that once in power they will all be rehabilitated in Bengal. The other view towards this generous gesture is that the CPI(M) was looking to develop a mass base among the considerable number of Refugees already in Bengal, plus encourage more to come into Bengal. In a demonstration in a refugee camp in Dandakaranya, the leader of CPI(M) himself invited all of them to Bengal, and the response he got was overwhelming.

The exodus
The refugees took the invitation to be genuine and as soon as the Left Front government first came to power in Calcutta in 1977, the refugees decided to move back to West Bengal. The refugees had a committee named Udbastu Unnyansil Samity who sent representatives to Bengal. And they decided upon settling in Marichjhanpi an island in Sunderbans. The CPI(M) was apprehensive on the selection of the place due to its association with the Sunderban Tiger Project. However they decided not to be too antagonistic from the beginning and mentioned that the refugees may come but they have to settle themselves.

This did not deter the refugees and many families went to the Sundarbans, especially those who were originally from the nearby district of Khulna in Bangladesh, and who already had relatives living from before in clearings in the forest.

Antagonism to the exodus
The massive inflow of refugees resulted in administrative troubles. Many were arrested in their way and deported back to Dandyak. But that could not discourage all of the refugees who had sold off their meager belongings and decided to move out of Dandyak at any cost. Finally almost 40,000 of them reached Hasnabad and about 500 of them settled at Marichjhanpi.

See also 

 Marichjhapi incident

References

External links
A documentary on the 1978-79 Marichjhanpi Massacre

Islands of West Bengal
Geography of South 24 Parganas district
Sundarbans
Violence in India
1978 in India
1979 in India
1970s in West Bengal
Conflicts in 1978
Conflicts in 1979
Islands of India
Uninhabited islands of India
Islands of the Bay of Bengal